Cash on delivery (COD), sometimes called collect on delivery or cash on demand, is the sale of goods by mail order where payment is made on delivery rather than in advance. If the goods are not paid for, they are returned to the retailer. Originally, the term applied only to payment by cash but as other forms of payment have become more common, the word "cash" has sometimes been replaced with the word "collect" to include transactions by checks, money orders, credit cards or debit cards.

Advantages and disadvantages for retailers
The advantages of COD for online or mail order retailers are:
The customer does not need to own a credit card to purchase
Impulse purchases may increase as payment is not due at the time of ordering
The credibility of retailers may be increased because the consumer only has to pay when the item is delivered

The disadvantages of COD for online or mail order retailers are:
Orders might be returned as buyers are less committed to the purchase than if they had paid in advance (which lead to the eventual elimination of C.O.D. with many TV offers in the United States and Canada by the early 1980s).
Logistics partners charge additional for COD orders

Limits
Most operators impose a limit on the amount of money that can be collected per delivery or per day using COD services. Limits may be higher for non-cash payments. Canada Post, for instance, applies a limit of C$1000 for cash, but C$5,000 for payment by check or money order.

Popularity in the developing world
In some countries COD remains a popular option with internet-based retailers, since it is far easier to set up for small businesses and does not require the purchaser to have a credit card. Many small businesses prefer cash payment to credit card payment, as it avoids credit card processing fees. Some shops also offer discounts if paid in cash, because they can offer a better price to the consumer.

COD is a widely used model in India. The overwhelming majority of e-shopping transactions in the Middle East are COD. Sixty percent of online transactions in the UAE and Middle East are done by cash on delivery and this has also led to the growth of courier companies offering a COD service.

See also
Wrapper
 Parcel post
 Avis de réception

References

External links

Payment systems
Payment terms
Payment methods in retailing
Postal systems